Monochroa rebeli is a moth of the family Gelechiidae. It was described by M. Hering in 1927. It is found on the Canary Islands.

The wingspan is about 8 mm.

The larvae feed on Rumex lunaria. They mine the leaves of their host plant. The mine has the form of a spiraling gallery, widening into a large blotch. The frass is deposited in a central line in the gallery, but dispersed in the blotch. Pupation takes place outside of the mine.

References

Moths described in 1927
Monochroa